One Bayfront Plaza is a proposed supertall skyscraper in Miami, Florida, U.S. The building, construction of which has been approved, would stand at , with 93 floors, becoming the tallest building in Miami and Florida. One Bayfront Plaza would primarily consist of offices and hotel space, but also would include a retail mall, condominiums, and parking garage on the lower levels, as well as possibly an observation deck at the top. The building's primary advocate is real estate developer Tibor Hollo, who has won several awards for his 55 years as a developer in Miami, and is currently the president of Florida East Coast Realty.

One Bayfront Plaza has gone through several design revisions since its original proposal as a single, 80-floor,  tower, which exceeded height restrictions. The development was planned to include an adjacent, connected 850-room hotel tower referred to as 100 South Biscayne II. Both buildings in the complex had a scheduled groundbreaking in 2011, and were estimated to be completed by 2015. Most recent news suggests the development is back to a single 1,010-foot tower design with a large podium, which was given a possible 2014 groundbreaking; however, by 2014 it was stated that the project was being put off at least until the completion of FECR's under construction Panorama Tower in 2017.

History

One Bayfront Plaza was originally proposed as a  office and hotel tower. The design included  of office space, a 650-room hotel and a 3,000 space parking garage. However, due to the height limits for buildings in downtown Miami and the possibility of interference with aviation traffic going into and coming out of Miami International Airport, it was unlikely that the building would be approved for construction with the proposed height. The FAA conducted hundreds of impact surveys in the downtown area and negotiated with many building developers during the mid-2000s boom to lower the planned heights of their buildings. The FAA reasoned that the skyscrapers interfered with their radar, in addition to being a physical hazard to landing planes. The redesigned One Bayfront Plaza was approved at its exceptional height of 1,049 feet due to its determination by the city as a significant landmark and because it got a Major Use Special Permit (MUSP).

In July 2007, a revised design of the building was released. The major feature of the new design was the incorporation of a separate hotel building to be located adjacent to the tower. The main tower was to be all office space. This revised design was subsequently approved by the City of Miami on July 25, 2007, but construction never began. In the fall of 2008, the building's height was scaled back again slightly due to new zoning laws to its current design as a single, 80-floor, 1,010-foot tower. The single tower would contain residential space at the bottom, accounting for the higher floor count. This design of the tower was to incorporate fluid dampers used to absorb wind gusts and create energy efficiency for the skyscraper. The tower was designed to resemble a sail to reflect the bay it overlooks.

In mid-2011 it was announced that the project was still alive and that the plan should be ready in 14 months. It was also announced that architectural firm Kohn Pedersen Fox had been chosen to work on the project to help TERRA Architecture with the design. The plan was released in early 2012 and included another redesign of the tower.

In 2016, the project was revived as a 93-story mixed-use building, with 1,000 parking spaces and a commitment to the Metromover connection.

Design and location

One Bayfront Plaza will be located at a waterfront site along Biscayne Boulevard, overlooking both Biscayne Bay and Bayfront Park. A pedestrian bridge will connect it to the Bayfront Park Metromover station located directly in front of it.

The groundbreaking of One Bayfront Plaza was scheduled to take place in 2011. The late construction date set at that point was mostly because an 18-story,  building built circa 1959, also marketed as One Bayfront Plaza, already exists on the 100 South Biscayne site, and is still a profitable office building. This building must be demolished before construction can begin. However, as recently as March 2011, three-year leases were being offered on the existing building, suggesting a new start date no earlier than 2014. In late 2012 it was reported that leases in the existing building ran until the end of 2014. The Florida East Coast Realty Group, the building's developer, estimates that the building will take no more than three years to complete, and had estimated an opening sometime in 2015, now pushed back to 2017 or later.

The 80th floor of the original design was planned to be an observation deck, the first one in Miami. The complex was later redesigned as two 70-floor towers, with the main tower being all office space, hence taller. The shorter tower was to be all hotel space. The current design goes back to a single mixed-use tower with 80 floors on a large podium with the top floors being office space and the bottom being hotel or residential space. The observation deck can be seen in the schematic diagram. Two FECR published sources have gone back to the floor count of 80 with the 1,010-foot design, and renderings of this design from 2009 show an observation deck, as well as the Metromover connection, in the blueprints.

Height
The tower is also the only building planned to rise over  that has ever been approved in Miami. One Bayfront Plaza would surpass the  Panorama Tower, which is currently the tallest building both in Miami and the state of Florida. The height was reduced to its current  due to height restrictions in the new Miami 21 zoning laws.

100 South Biscayne II
100 South Biscayne II was the name of the proposed hotel tower that would have been located adjacent to the main One Bayfront Plaza tower in the 100 South Biscayne complex, connected at the bottom by the large retail area and parking garage making up the podium. The tower was planned to rise  with 70 floors and would have consisted of an 850-room hotel with a  convention center. 100 South Biscayne II was approved on July 25, 2007, and groundbreaking was scheduled to take place in 2011. It has been canceled as the final design scale back has remerged the development back into one mixed-use tower.

See also

List of tallest buildings in Miami
The Towers by Foster + Partners
Waldorf Astoria Miami
World Trade Center of the Americas
One Brickell City Center

Notes
 A. ^  Due to several design revisions, sources are conflicting between 70 and 80 floors for the current 1,010-foot design. It is possible that the 1,049 design which was to be all office space with the hotel separate would only contain 70 floors while the current mixed use tower could reach 80 floors in less total height due to the smaller floor heights of residential space.

References

External links 
Project Website

Leadership in Energy and Environmental Design basic silver certified buildings
Office buildings in Miami
Skyscrapers in Miami
Proposed skyscrapers in the United States